The Buffet Tour is the twelfth and final concert tour by American recording artist R. Kelly. The tour supported his thirteenth studio album, The Buffet (2015). The tour played over 30 concerts in the United States.

Background
The tour was announced March 2016 by various music publications, including Billboard. Kelly referred to his tour as his most ambitious production. The tour was quickly met with controversy as the students and faculty of Saint Louis University boycotted Kelly's concert, to be held at the Chaifetz Arena on April 29, 2016. A Change.org petition was created to have the concert cancelled, citing Kelly's troubled career. The concert was quickly moved to the suburb of St. Charles at the Family Arena.

The debut concert featured Kelly performing for nearly 4 hours and featured various skits making light of his criminal past. Intended to be a 40 city tour, many shows were canceled, citing the elaborate production and Kelly's fear of flying as reasons. The tour is believed to have earned nearly $50 million.

Critical reception
The tour was met with mixed reactions from many music critics. They unanimously cited the shows felt disorganized, with the setlist being too "loose". Kenya Vaughn (The St. Louis American) called this disjointed, stating: "This particular portion of the show was almost an R. Kelly overdose thanks to the lack of focus and the emphasis on quantity instead of a masterful delivery on songs selected for maximum impact. The show had grown boring until he [re-]positioned himself to the middle of the arena for a brief set that included a tribute to Prince. As he continues to shape the show, he should consider narrowing the focus of the show—hopefully into something that looks more like his grown and sexy incarnation that he closed the show with."

In Kansas City, Timothy Finn (The Kansas City Star) found the concert to be odd. He continued to say: "There was a live band onstage, but it was swept into the corner, shrouded by darkness, and its performances sounded secondary to the other music and sounds coming off the stage. They brought to a close a show that, though wandering and reckless at times, sated the appetites of fans who came to indulge in the libidinous sounds of one of pop music's more mercurial, prolific and controversial stars."

The show in Tampa, reviewed by Jay Cridlin (Tampa Bay Times) states: "All of these moments screamed R. Kelly – silly, sexy, soulful and at times very, very strange. Over the course of his two-hour concert, these moments kept right on coming, one after the next, eventually sketching out a portrait of one of R&B's greatest and most mystifying performers, in all his freaktacular glory."

The same sentiments were felt by Liz Tracy (Miami New Times) for the show in Miami. She says: "If it wasn't clear before, Kelly can sing. The crowd was reciting the lyrics all along, writhing in sonic ecstasy, but at the end, they were just in it to win it. [...] It's clear Kelly will never outrun his own demons. They are too thick to sidestep. But he'll take what he can get, rejoicing for now in being purged clean of his sins in his own mind and in the minds of his loyal followers."

Opening acts
Demetria McKinney 
June's Diary

Setlist
The following setlist was obtained from the concert held on April 29, 2016, at the Family Arena in St. Charles, Missouri. It does not represent all concerts for the duration of the tour.
"Video Sequence"
"My Story"
"Make It Rain" / "We Been On" / "Hotel" / "So Sexy" / "Wonderful" / "That's That" / "Go Getta" / "Thoia Thoing" / "Snake" / "Get This Money" / "Gigolo" / "Fuck You Tonight"
"Home Alone"
"Legs Shakin'"
"Video Sequence"
 "Sex Me" / "The Zoo" / "Slow Wind" / "Half on a Baby" / "In the Kitchen" / "Strip For You" / "Number One" / "Cookie"
"Ignition (Remix)" / "Fiesta (Remix)" / "I'm a Flirt (Remix)" / "Freaky In The Club"
"Your Body's Callin'" / "It Seems Like You're Ready" / "12 Play" 
"Slow Dance (Hey Mr. DJ)" / "Honey Love" 
"Down Low (Nobody Has to Know)" / "It Seems Like You're Ready" / "You Remind Me of Something" / "Feelin' on Yo Booty" / "Bump N' Grind"
"Video Sequence"
"I Wish" / "When a Woman's Fed Up" / "Contagious" 
"Purple Rain"
"I Believe I Can Fly"
"A Change Is Gonna Come"
"When a Woman Loves"
Encore
"Happy People"
"Step in the Name of Love (Remix)"

Tour dates

Cancellations and rescheduled shows

Box office score data

References

2016 concert tours
R. Kelly concert tours